Paul Tourigny (November 2, 1852 – January 31, 1926) was a Canadian politician in the province of Quebec.

Born in Saint-Christophe-d'Arthabaska, Lower Canada, the son of Landry Tourigny and Lucie Poirier, Tourigny was mayor of Victoriaville from 1892 to 1898 and again from 1900 to 1910. He was acclaimed to the Legislative Assembly of Quebec for the riding of Arthabaska in 1900. A Liberal, He was acclaimed again in 1904, re-elected in 1908 and in 1912. He did not run in the 1916 election. He was appointed to the Legislative Council of Quebec for the Kennebec division in 1921. He served until his death in Victoriaville in 1926.

References

External links
 

1852 births
1926 deaths
Quebec Liberal Party MLCs
Quebec Liberal Party MNAs